The Seychellense Ambassador in Beijing is the official representative of the Government of in Victoria, Seychelles to the Government of the People's Republic of China. He is Non-Resident Ambassador to Seoul (South Korea)

List of representatives

China–Seychelles relations

References 

Ambassadors of Seychelles to China
China
Seychelles